Coleophora tsherkesi is a moth of the family Coleophoridae. It is found in Turkestan and Uzbekistan.

Adults have longitudinal grayish striae (stripes). They are on wing from the end of May to the beginning of June.

The larvae feed on the fruit of Arbuscula richteri. They create a silky case, consisting of five to six cylindrical belts, readily discernible only in incomplete and not fully covered cases. The valve is three-sided and constructed after discarding fruits at the caudal end of the case. To hibernate, the larva moves into the sand where it constructs a conical operculum (flap) to cover the oral opening of the case that is covered with sand. The length of the case is 4.5-5.5 mm and the color is dark brown. Larvae can be found from September to October. Fully fed larvae hibernate.

References

tsherkesi
Moths of Asia
Moths described in 1970